The National Police is the national civilian police force of Niger. The National Police are under the Ministry of Interior, Public Safety and Decentralization and report to the General Directorate of National Police. They are responsible for law enforcement in urban areas, the protection of government buildings and institutions, and the security of government leaders. Niger's gendarmerie, the Gendarmerie Nationale, is a separate agency under the Niger Armed Forces, and are responsible for policing in rural areas.

The National Police numbered approximately 5,000 in 2014. The Niger police emergency number is 17.

The National Police sponsor a semi-professional football club, AS Police, which plays in the Super Ligue.

Organization 
The General Directorate of the National Police is the highest structure of the National Police of Niger and is headed by Director-General Souley Boubacar. The General Directorate of the National Police is subdivided in 9 directorates. The directorates are:
 Directorate of the National School of the Police -- 
 Directorate of Financial Resources --
 Directorate of Human Resources --
 Directorate of Logistics and Infrastructures --
 Directorate of Public Security --
 Directorate of Judiciary Police --
 Division of Criminal Investigations --
 Division of Financial and Economic Investigations --
 Division of Vice and the Protection of Minors --
 Division of Cybercriminality, Statistics and Analysis --
 National Central Bureau - Interpol --
 Anti-Drug Center --
 Judiciary Identity Central Service --
 Inter-regional Judiciary Service --
 Directorate of Homeland Intelligence --
 Directorate of Protection of High Personality --
 Directorate of Studies and Technical Cooperation --

Criticism 
Foreign governments have accused the National Police of being poorly trained, equipped, and corrupt. The United States Department of State has alleged that Nigerian police officers commonly ask victims of crimes to pay them for assistance when called, that police may not actually respond to calls for service, and that police take a very long time to respond. The National Police's vehicles have also been criticized for lacking basic necessities such as fuel.

See also
Law enforcement in Niger

References

 Fund for Peace, Governance Report for Nigerien institutions, 2007.
 Government of Niger: United States State Department report, 2004.
 Ministère de l'Intérieur, de la Sécurité Publique et de la Décentralisation, Presidency of Niger, 2007.
 MANUEL DE FORMATION EN DROITS DE L’HOMME POUR LA POLICE (Police Nationale Niger). Compiled and funded by Direction Générale de la Police Nationale (Niger), Faculté des Sciences Economiques et Juridiques (FSEJ) -- Niamey, Institut Danois des Droits de l’Homme (IDDH) -- Denmark, & Agence Danoise de Développement (DANIDA) --Denmark. (2004)

Government of Niger
Law enforcement in Niger